"Showtime" is a two-part episode of the Canadian teen drama Degrassi High. It was the tenth and eleventh episodes of the show's second season, airing on CBC on 28 January and 4 February 1991. In the two-part episode, the titular school is thrown into disarray after Archie "Snake" Simpson (Stefan Brogren) finds Claude Tanner (David Armin-Parcells) dead from a self-inflicted gunshot wound. The episode was the first time the franchise had depicted suicide.

Production 
Degrassi's producers had avoided tackling the topic of suicide, as they feared they would mishandle it and potentially cause copycat suicides. David Armin-Parcells, who plays Claude Tanner, the student who commits suicide, said to the Montreal Gazette: "I think the show portrays suicide as harsh, and keeps away from romanticizing death." For the episode, they aimed to avoid glorifying suicide, instead focusing on the damage it does to those around someone who does it.

A message ran before the beginning of the first part, presented by actors Stacie Mistysyn and Pat Mastroianni. In the message, Mistysyn tells the viewer; "What you're about to see is a dramatic story about suicide". Mastroianni states that if the characters in the show had taken Claude's signs seriously, they could have called for adult intervention, and the phone number for the Boys Town National Hotline is displayed in a chyron on the bottom of the screen. On part two, before the credits, there is another message from Mistysyn and Mastroianni, the former of which assures that Armin-Parcells did not actually commit suicide. The hotline is again displayed at the end.

Broadcast 
On PBS, the episode was followed by a live phone-in telecast.

Plot

Part one  
Degrassi High is planning on hosting a talent show, which has been named Showtime. Lucy Fernandez (Anais Granofsky) and Bronco Davis (L. Dean Ifill) are hosting auditions in the gym, and several other students, such as Caitlin Ryan (Stacie Mistysyn), Maya Goldberg (Kyra Levy) and Claude Tanner (David Armin-Parcells), are planning to audition. Caitlin and Maya discuss their nerves for the audition on their way to the gym, but are approached by Claude, who asks if Caitlin is planning to audition. She says she is, to which Claude replies so is he. Caitlin wishes him good luck. Claude asks her if they could rekindle their relationship, but Caitlin scoffs and walks away, telling Maya she wished Claude would leave her alone. Joey Jeremiah (Pat Mastroianni) and Archie "Snake" Simpson (Stefan Brogren) are also planning to audition

When Claude is called to audition, he recites a very morbid poem. Joey snickers at him, but Snake tells him to stop and let him finish. Bronco cuts off Claude, telling him that while his poem was good, it wasn't right for the show, as it was too serious for the otherwise good-natured intentions of the talent show. Angered, Claude storms out, calling everyone a "bunch of sheep". While Joey laughs at him, Snake begins to show concern. Joanne Rutherford (Krista Houston), his friend, follows Claude out and tells him that she cares, but Claude, while thanking her for being supportive, retorts that "you don't know what it's like to be me" and leaves.

Back in the gym, Joey and Snake do their act, which consists of wearing big sombreros with faces drawn on their shirtless bodies, dancing to "Everybody Wants Something" by their band The Zit Remedy. The next day, Claude approaches Caitlin at her locker holding a white rose. Caitlin refuses to take the rose, and tells him to stop harassing her. Claude tells her that he won't bother her anymore and that he came to say goodbye. An unmoved Caitlin asks him where is he going, to which he backs and walks away. Caitlin scoffs to Maya, "What a creep!".

Claude goes to his locker and opens it. Scott Smith (Byrd Dickens) passes by and tells Claude that he will be late for class, but Claude responds that he won't be going to any more classes, as Degrassi has never done anything for him. Scott scoffs that he will get in trouble and walks away. Claude says "No...I won't". As the hallways empty, Claude produces a gun from his bag and walks in the direction of the boys washroom, leaving his locker open.

In class, Mr. Walfish (Adam David) is speaking to his class about Shakespeare's Macbeth. The class gets into an enthusiastic discussion about the book, and Mr. Walfish says he'd like to hear from some new students. Snake raises his hand and when he is called on, he asks to use the bathroom. Snake leaves as the class chuckles at him. He walks right past Claude's locker without realizing that it's been left open. Snake walks up to a stall where he notices a shoe sticking out from the bottom and blood. When he pushes the stall open, he sees Claude's body (although the viewer doesn't). Stunned, Snake backs away and dashes to Mr. Raditch (Dan Woods)' office to inform him of what he had just seen. Raditch then tells the school secretary to call the police.

Despite the sounds of sirens outside, the talent show auditions continue, with everyone unaware of the current situation. Later, students begin to notice that something has happened, with the washroom closed off by police. Various students express annoyance at having to walk across school to use the other bathroom instead. Luke Matthews (Andy Chambers) suggests to Yick Yu (Siluck Saysanasy) that it was probably a drug bust. Dale (Cameron Graham) tells Derek "Wheels" Wheeler (Neil Hope) that he saw an ambulance and stretcher.

Each class is then informed of Claude's suicide. In Mr. Walfish's class, where he begins by saying a student had died and it looked like a suicide, the reaction is initially silent, until Tessa Campanelli (Kirsten Bourne) asks who it was. When Walfish says it was Claude, Caitlin is stunned. The reactions to the suicide are mixed, with some students, such as Lucy and Christine "Spike" Nelson (Amanda Stepto), arguing  that it was selfish for him to commit suicide, because now everybody has to suffer. One of the teachers tells the class that there is no right way to react to the situation, and informs them that school would be let out early. Cindy (Marsha Ferguson) declares that Claude is "going to hell", as suicide is a sin, and breaks down.

Caitlin and Maya head out of the school together and Maya asks Caitlin if she'd like to go for a walk. Caitlin feels guilty about the suicide, because Claude tried to speak to her, but she told him to go away, and that she should have just spoken to him. Maya says that Caitlin only told him to go away because he was bothering her, and that she had broken up with him over a year prior, and that it wasn't her responsibility to speak to him. Caitlin wonders if she could have made a difference, but Maya insists that Caitlin wasn't the reason for the suicide, and that he clearly had a lot of problems. She wonders aloud why Claude didn't ask for help.

Joey waits by his locker after school and asks Tim O'Connor (Keith White) if he knew where Snake was. Throughout the halls, students ask and wonder why Claude killed himself. Joey waits for a few more moments for Snake, unaware that Snake was the student who found Claude's body, before just closing his locker and leaving the school alone.

Bronco and Lucy head into the auditorium together so that Bronco can retrieve his binder. Bronco blames himself for Claude's suicide, saying that he should've just let him do his monologue the previous day. Lucy tells him that thinking that way is ridiculous, and that there's no way that Claude killed himself over the messy audition. Bronco ignores her, and tells Lucy that they need to cancel the talent show, that it wouldn't be right to have the show. Lucy doesn't want to cancel it, since it's not for another two weeks and tries telling Bronco that they put a lot of work into the show and can't just cancel it now.

Caitlin arrives home that evening as her mother (Dona Hird) is getting ready to go pick up Caitlin's father (Martin Brown), whose car has broken down. Before she leaves, she asks Caitlin when she got a new boyfriend. Caitlin is confused and says she isn't dating anyone new. Mrs. Ryan smiles and says that someone sent Caitlin flowers. Caitlin hurries to open the package, smiling. The box contains a bouquet of white roses and a note. Caitlin reads the note and her smile fades as she realizes who it's from.

Caitlin gets angrier and more upset as she reads, before crumpling up Claude's note and throwing the bouquet to the floor.

Part two 
A group of students, led by Lucy and Bronco, convene in the gym and discuss the future of the talent show. Joanne argues it is disrespectful to hold the talent show after someone died, but Lucy argues back that not everything has to stop just because of what happened, stating, "He's gone...we're still here..life has to go on." Joanne gets angry and storms out of the gym. Spike puts her hand up and suggests they hold the talent show as a benefit for Claude's family, a proposal which is unanimously agreed upon. After the meeting is over, Maya and Caitlin discuss Claude. Caitlin expresses she is glad that "we are not letting that creep ruin everything", and that she would never attend a "suicide's funeral". She vows that she will not let Claude's affect her.

In science class, Mr. Webster (John Weir) pairs Joey, who is having trouble and Caitlin, who hears Claude calling her name in her head, for a project. In the hallways, Wheels asks Joey the whereabouts of Snake, to which Joey says he's taking time off. He also asks Joey about rumors that it was Snake who found Claude, which Joey confirms.

Joey approaches Snake at his home while fixing his bike. He asks Snake when is he coming back, to which Snake responds his therapist recommended he return when he is ready. He then tells Joey that when he found Claude, half of his face had been removed, and said that he thought he would "resemble a person", but that he was "just dead". He laments that if he had gotten there sooner, he might have been able to stop him, and starts to become extremely anxious. Joey asks him if there is anything he can do. After a few moments, Snake softly pushes Joey, which leads to a play-fight that lightens the mood.

At night, Caitlin dreams of watching Claude in the gym reciting his poem while holding the same white rose. When she gets up, she sees Claude again, this time at the exit door. She looks back again to see the Claude on stage descend and walk up to her holding the rose. It then cuts to Caitlin in her bed, mumbling "No...".

After science class the next day, Caitlin invites Joey to her place to do the project. When she sifts through her locker, she discovers a peace symbol earring that Claude had given to her in a previous episode, as he sported the other one. Angered, Caitlin throws it on the floor. At her house, she shows a defensive attitude to Joey, who is making light-hearted jokes, but the two make progress on the project. Later, after Caitlin fixes Joey a drink, Claude is brought up, and Caitlin mumbles that he was "messed up". Despite Joey's constant questioning, Caitlin declares she doesn't want to talk about it. Joey tells Caitlin that she keeps bringing it up, and asks her why she doesn't want to talk about it.

Caitlin tells Joey that she didn't mean to hurt Claude, but Joey responds that he hurt Caitlin and everybody else, as he wanted everyone else to be "crying and have a big memorial". He further states that Claude is a pig, but Caitlin breaks down and says he loved her, but Joey responds that he wanted to hurt her and make her feel guilty, and not give him the satisfaction. Caitlin and Joey embrace.

At the talent show, Bronco introduces Joanne, who ushers in the talent show with a speech where she states that the show is for anybody who feels depressed, and that she wished Claude could be there. After this, the talent show commences. Backstage, Joey tells Caitlin that Snake didn't want to come back, so Wheels is taking his place instead for their talent show act. Caitlin thanks Joey for listening to her.

Reception 
The Vancouver Sun's Hester Riches stated that the producers of Degrassi had created a "tight drama" that was "unflinchingly unsympathetic" to the act of suicide, noting other contemporary American movies that appeared to glamorize it. In 2022, B.R. Doherty of the Canberra Times called the episode "groundbreaking" and declared it "remains shocking and served as something of a full-stop to our own childhood".

The two-parter aired uncensored on the Australian television network ABC during its original run, but was altered or censored when it aired again on Nickelodeon Australia.

References 

Degrassi High episodes
Television episodes about suicide
1991 television episodes